Harvey is a city in Cook County, Illinois, United States. The population was 20,324 at the 2020 census. 

Harvey is bordered by the villages of Dixmoor and Riverdale to the north; Dolton, Phoenix, and South Holland to the east; East Hazel Crest to the south; and Hazel Crest, Markham and Posen to the west.

History

Harvey was founded in 1891 by Turlington W. Harvey, a close associate of Dwight Moody, the founder of the Moody Bible Institute in Chicago. It was closely modeled after the company town of Pullman, which eventually was annexed into the city of Chicago.

The city had its greatest growth in the prosperous postwar years, when it was home to the Buda Engine Co., which was acquired by Allis-Chalmers in 1953. The city reached its peak population in 1980. By this time, it was beginning to suffer losses in jobs and population through restructuring of steel and similar industries. The Dixie Square Mall closed in November 1978.

In the 2000s and 2010s, Mayor Eric Kellogg attempted to boost Harvey's economy, with little success.  Kellogg offered developers millions of dollars in incentives to revive the long-vacant Dixie Square Mall, but trends in retail adversely affected malls around the country. The city granted a developer $10 million in incentives to redevelop the Chicago Park Hotel, but he abandoned the project before completion, leaving the building gutted.

In February 2018, Harvey became the first city in Illinois to have its revenue garnished by the State in order to fund the city's pension liabilities. The city laid off employees in order to deal with the changes.

Geography

Demographics

As of the 2020 census there were 20,324 people, 8,657 households, and 5,492 families residing in the city. The racial makeup of the city was 63.33% African American, 5.87% White, 2.50% Asian, 0.82% Native American,0.04% Pacific Islander, 20.55% from other races, and 6.89% from two or more races. Hispanic or Latino of any race were 29.72% of the population.

There were 8,657 households, out of which 59.52% had children under the age of 18 living with them, 27.90% were married couples living together, 31.00% had a female householder with no husband present, and 36.56% were non-families. 33.67% of all households were made up of individuals, and 13.49% had someone living alone who was 65 years of age or older. The average household size was 3.62 and the average family size was 2.77.

The city's age distribution consisted of 25.8% under the age of 18, 11.9% from 18 to 24, 24.2% from 25 to 44, 24.7% from 45 to 64, and 13.5% who were 65 years of age or older. The median age was 34.5 years. For every 100 females, there were 91.0 males. For every 100 females age 18 and over, there were 89.2 males.

The median income for a household in the city was $32,635, and the median income for a family was $45,729. Males had a median income of $28,204 versus $24,671 for females. The per capita income for the city was $18,919. About 25.3% of families and 31.1% of the population were below the poverty line, including 47.6% of those under age 18 and 17.6% of those age 65 or over.

Note: the US Census treats Hispanic/Latino as an ethnic category. This table excludes Latinos from the racial categories and assigns them to a separate category. Hispanics/Latinos can be of any race.

Government 
Harvey is in Illinois's 2nd congressional district.

The city faces severe financial problems. From 2010 to 2013, it failed to fund its police and fire pensions, paying just $140 of $10.1 million required contributions. This problem has been reported in other Chicago suburbs with economic problems. Since 2007, Harvey has refused to audit its municipal finances as required by the state. The Securities and Exchange Commission alleges that during this time, there was "a scheme to divert bond proceeds for improper purposes."

As of September 2014, some aldermen were concerned the city could soon be unable to make payroll. In 2017 the city was forced to pay almost $11 million in unpaid and underpaid pension fund contributions for the city's firefighters. A panel of judges on the Illinois First District Appellate Court in Chicago determined that Harvey's mayor and city Council had improperly abused their discretionary powers for years. According to the Cook County Record, "The case had landed in Cook County court in 2010, when the Board of Trustees of the City of Harvey Firefighters’ Pension Fund first filed suit against the city of Harvey, alleging chronic underfunding of the pension fund, which managed pension money for 67 retired firefighters, had left the fund teetering on the verge of insolvency."

Education
Harvey Public School District 152 operates public elementary schools in most of Harvey. A portion of Harvey is within the Posen-Robbins School District 143½.
and a Portion is within the [Dolton - Riverdale School District 148]
Thornton Township High Schools District 205 operates the public high school. The portion under the Posen-Robbins School District 143½ is a part of the Bremen High School District 228.

Harvey is located within Illinois Community College District 510.

Infrastructure

Transportation

Harvey is served by two stations along the Metra Electric University Park line to Chicago. One is at 147th Street (a.k.a. Sibley Boulevard) and Clinton Street, and the other is at Park Avenue and 154th Street. Eleven Pace bus routes serve Harvey and the Pace Harvey Transportation Center.

Three major north-south streets in Chicago venture as far south as Harvey in some capacity. Halsted Street (Illinois Route 1) runs through the east side of town. Dixie Highway, as it is known in Harvey, is Western Avenue in Chicago. Finally, Chicago's Ashland Avenue becomes Wood Street in Harvey. The reason for this is a surveyor's error along the line where Interstate 57 is now located; Harvey's street names and numbers conform to the section lines rather than actual distance from Chicago's base lines (as indicated by the jogs in Halsted Street near 150th Street and 159th Street between Harvey and Markham, as examples). Harvey's own Ashland Avenue serves as the east-west dividing line for house numbering.

Notable people

Representation in other media
The Dixie Square Mall, an abandoned shopping mall in Harvey, was the setting for filming of the car chase scene in The Blues Brothers.

See also

References

External links

 City website
 Harvey Public Library District

 
Cities in Illinois
1891 establishments in Illinois
Cities in Cook County, Illinois
Populated places established in 1891
Majority-minority cities and towns in Cook County, Illinois